Kenwick Station is a railway station on the Transperth network. It is located on the Armadale Line, 15.8 kilometres from Perth Station serving the suburb of Kenwick.

History
Kenwick station opened in 1914. In 1982–83, the platforms were extended. The station closed on 31 March 2014 for a six-month upgrade. It reopened on 27 October 2014.

Opposite the station lies a connection to the Kwinana freight line.

Services
Kenwick station is served by Transperth Armadale Line services.

The station saw 148,340 passengers in the 2013-14 financial year.

Platforms

References

External links

Armadale and Thornlie lines
Railway stations in Perth, Western Australia
Railway stations in Australia opened in 1914
Kenwick, Western Australia